Azeliinae is a subfamily within the Diptera family Muscidae. Some authors place members within the subfamily Muscinae.

References

Muscidae
Brachycera subfamilies
Articles containing video clips
Taxa named by Jean-Baptiste Robineau-Desvoidy